"Cut the Cake" is a song written and performed by Average White Band. It was featured on their 1975 album Cut the Cake. The song was arranged by Roger Ball and produced by Arif Mardin.

The song nominated for the Grammy Award for Best R&B Performance by a Duo or Group with Vocals at the 1976 Grammy Awards, but it lost to "Shining Star" by Earth, Wind & Fire.

Chart performance
"Cut the Cake" reached  7 on the U.S. R&B chart,  10 on the U.S. pop chart,  13 on the U.S. dance chart,  11 in Canada, and  31 on the UK Singles Chart in 1975. 
The song ranked  70 on Billboard magazine's Top 100 singles of 1975 and  151 on the Canadian year-end chart.

AWB re-released the song in 1986 where it reached  34 on the U.S. R&B chart and  45 on the UK Singles Chart.

Other versions
Jeff Golub released a version of the song on the 2002 various artists album KKSF 103.7 - Sampler 13: Smooth Jazz.

Sampling
AWB's version was sampled by Chill Rob G on his 1989 song "Dope Rhymes" from the album Ride the Rhythm.

References

1975 songs
1975 singles
1986 singles
Atlantic Records singles
Average White Band songs